Curtain Call (also titled Hank Mobley Quintet Featuring Sonny Clark) is an album by jazz saxophonist Hank Mobley, released on the Japanese Blue Note label in 1984. It was recorded on August 18, 1957 and features Mobley, trumpeter Kenny Dorham, bassist Jimmy Rowser, pianist Sonny Clark, and drummer Art Taylor.

Reception
The Allmusic review by Lee Bloom awarded the album 3 stars stating "Despite an occasional tendency for Mobley's relaxed articulation to sound a bit languorous, his playing is generally enjoyable, and his writing exhibits character, maturity, and a uniquely rhythmic approach to crafting memorable melodies.".

Track listing 

All compositions by Hank Mobley except as indicated

 "Don't Get Too Hip" - 10:59
 "Curtain Call" - 5:27
 "Deep in a Dream" (Jimmy Van Heusen, Eddie DeLange) - 6:01
 "The Mobe" - 6:22
 "My Reverie" (Claude Debussy, Larry Clinton) - 5:34
 "On the Bright Side" - 7:14

Personnel 
 Hank Mobley - tenor saxophone
 Kenny Dorham - trumpet
 Sonny Clark - piano
 Jimmy Rowser - bass
 Art Taylor - drums

Charts

References 

1984 albums
Albums produced by Alfred Lion
Albums recorded at Van Gelder Studio
Blue Note Records albums
Hank Mobley albums
Hard bop albums